Shawn E. Beals (born August 16, 1966) is a former American football wide receiver. He played college football at Idaho State from 1985 to 1987. He then played professional football in National Football League (NFL). He began with the Miami Dolphins during the 1988 pre-season.  He was released by the Dolphins prior to the start of the regular season and was picked up by the Philadelphia Eagles. He appeared in 13 games for the Eagles during the 1988 season. He spent the 1989 season on the Washington Redskins' practice squad. He then moved to the Canadian Football League (CFL), spending three seasons with the Calgary Stampeders from 1990 to 1992 and one season with the Baltimore CFLers in 1994. He appeared in 49 games in the CFL with 136 receptions for 2,071 yards and nine touchdowns.

References

1966 births
Living people
Philadelphia Eagles players
Calgary Stampeders players
Baltimore Stallions players
Idaho State Bengals football players
American football wide receivers
Players of American football from California
Sportspeople from Walnut Creek, California